This is a list of episodes of the live-action/animated television series Zoboomafoo.

Series overview

Episodes

Season 1 (1999–2000)

Season 2 (2000–01)

References

Zoboomafoo
Zoboomafoo